"Right Hand Man" is the eighth song from Act 1 of the musical Hamilton, based on the life of Alexander Hamilton, which premiered on Broadway in 2015. Lin-Manuel Miranda wrote both the music and lyrics to the song. The song introduces then-General George Washington to the musical, and culminates with Hamilton becoming his eponymous "right-hand man".

Synopsis
At the very beginning of the American Revolutionary War, Alexander Hamilton reiterates his desire (as laid out in "My Shot") to fight in a war in order to rise up from his poor childhood. Aiming to be promoted to a position of command in the Continental Army, Hamilton hopes to get the attention of General George Washington, who had been appointed commander-in-chief at the Second Continental Congress. Aaron Burr then introduces Washington, who discusses his frustration with his forces in the fight for control of New York City. Hamilton attempts to reverse the tide of the battle by capturing British cannons that were attacking his unit in the Battery. These actions bring Hamilton to the attention of Washington, who decides to recruit an aide-de-camp after retreating from Brooklyn. Burr applies for this role, but is dismissed in favor of Hamilton, who reluctantly accepts the eponymous role at the song's conclusion.

The song contains the lyric, "Now I'm the model of a modern major general", which is adapted from the Major-General's Song from The Pirates of Penzance by Gilbert and Sullivan. The credits of the 2020 film adaptation of Hamilton acknowledge this as the source of the lyric.

Analysis
The song serves to introduce George Washington, a role originated on Broadway by Christopher Jackson.

Elizabeth Logan, writing for Huffington Post, considered the song to incorporate recurring motifs from the musical, such as "throwing away my shot" - a reference to My Shot. It further sows seeds of discord between Hamilton and Burr due to jealousy,  and this becomes important in Act 2 of the musical, where the two duel in Weehawken, New Jersey.

The lyric "Now I'm the model of a modern major general" is a reference to The West Wing and Gilbert and Sullivan's 1879 comic opera "The Pirates of Penzance". Lin-Manuel Miranda is known to be an avid fan of The West Wing, and this is one of several West Wing references in the musical. "I Am the Very Model of a Modern Major-General" is the first lyric in "Major-General's Song" in The Pirates of Penzance, which Aaron Sorkin references several times throughout season 2 episode 5 "And It's Surely to Their Credit". The phrase "model of a modern major general" appears in The West Wing in season 4 episode 14 "Inauguration: Part I" when President Bartlet speaks of Will Bailey's father.

The song receives a reprise later in the musical, when Washington asks Hamilton to assume the role of Secretary of the Treasury in the Cabinet of the United States.

Critical reception
BuzzFeed ranked the song as the 22nd best in the musical, while The Young Folks had it ranked 19th.

Vibe.com said that it marked a return to the initial "1990's feel" of the musical.

Certifications

References 

2015 songs
Songs from Hamilton (musical)